José Escobar (born 10 October 1975) is a Colombian wrestler. He competed in the men's Greco-Roman 68 kg at the 1996 Summer Olympics.

References

External links
 

1975 births
Living people
Colombian male sport wrestlers
Olympic wrestlers of Colombia
Wrestlers at the 1996 Summer Olympics
Place of birth missing (living people)
Pan American Games medalists in wrestling
Pan American Games silver medalists for Colombia
Wrestlers at the 2003 Pan American Games
20th-century Colombian people
21st-century Colombian people